The canton of Berre-l'Étang is an administrative division of the Bouches-du-Rhône department, in southeastern France. At the French canton reorganisation which came into effect in March 2015, it was expanded from 3 to 9 communes. Its seat is in Berre-l'Étang.

Composition

It consists of the following communes: 

Berre-l'Étang 
Cornillon-Confoux
Coudoux
La Fare-les-Oliviers
Lançon-Provence
Rognac
Saint-Chamas
Velaux
Ventabren

Councillors

Pictures of the canton

References

Cantons of Bouches-du-Rhône